Ravè unde is a popular Indian sweet that is often prepared during festivals and other religious ceremonies. The sweet is especially popular in the state of Karnataka.

Preparation 
As the name suggests, ravè unde is made of fine semolina (known as rava in parts of India), dried coconut, and sugar. Milk and ghee are two ingredients often used to bind the mixture together.

See also 
Cuisine of Karnataka

References

Indian cuisine
Karnataka cuisine